Khorramabad-e Sofla may refer to:
 Khorramabad-e Sofla, Kermanshah
 Khorramabad-e Sofla, Razavi Khorasan